The 2011 Iranian Futsal 2nd Division will be divided into two phases, the regular season, played from 6 April 2011.

The league will also be composed of 22 teams divided into two divisions of 11 teams each, whose teams will be divided geographically. Teams will play only other teams in their own division, once at home and once away for a total of 20 matches each.

Teams

Group A

Group B

Standings

Group A

Group B

Play off 
First leg to be played 25 September 2011; return leg to be played 1 October 2011

 Foolad Mahan Novin promoted to the 1st Division.

First leg

Return leg 

First leg to be played 25 September 2011; return leg to be played 1 October 2011

 Homan Saz promoted to the 1st Division.

First leg

Return leg

Top goalscorers

Top scorers, Group A
25 Goals
  Omid Talebi (Bimeh Hadis)

Top scorers, Group B
29 Goals
  Peyman Hafizi (Foolad Mahan)

See also 
 2010–11 Iranian Futsal Super League
 Futsal 1st Division 2010–11
 2010–11 Persian Gulf Cup
 2010–11 Azadegan League
 2010–11 Iran Football's 2nd Division
 2010–11 Iran Football's 3rd Division
 2010–11 Hazfi Cup
 Iranian Super Cup

References 

Iran Futsal's 2nd Division seasons
3
3